Onion News Network is a parody television news show that ran for two seasons of ten episodes each, both during 2011, on the Independent Film Channel.

History

In March 2007, The Onion launched The Onion News Network, a daily web video broadcast that had been in production since mid-2006. The Onion invested about $1 million in production and hired 15 staffers to focus on the venture. Carol Kolb, former Editor-in-Chief of The Onion, was the ONN's head writer, and Will Graham and Julie Smith were the executive producers.  Season 1 aired on Friday nights at 10pm. It was implied on-air that the ONN show "FactZone with Brooke Alvarez" is "simulcasted" on IFC Friday nights at 10pm ET.

For Season 1, the series was the only scripted live-action comedy series in the US to employ non-union writers. However, the writers unionized between Seasons 1 and 2 in the midst of a strike threat.

IFC renewed Onion News Network for a second season, which was sponsored by Acura. Season 2 aired on Tuesdays for the first three episodes, and then moved back to Friday nights beginning with the November 18, 2011 episode.  In March 2012, IFC publicly announced that they had not renewed ONN for a third season. Some time after the show's cancellation, a pilot for a new Onion Studios series titled Onion News Empire premiered on Amazon.com, which presented a fictitious "behind-the-scenes look" of The Onions "newsroom". It was not successfully picked up for a full series.

Cast

 Suzanne Sena – Brooke Alvarez
 Todd Alan Crain – Tucker Hope #8 (Season 1)
 Ryan Blackwell – Tucker Hope #9 (Season 2)
 Matt Oberg – Tucker Hope #10 (Season 2)*
 Brian Huskey – Duncan Birch
 Julie Brister – Lauralee Hickock
 Klea Blackhurst – Shelby Cross
 Dorothi Fox – Nancy Fichandler
 John Cariani – Michael Falk
 Malachy Cleary – David Barrodale (whose opinions are sponsored by Acura)
 Esther David – Jane Carmichael
 Peak Kwinarian – Brandon Armstrong (former ONN Newsroom anchor; died on October 25, 2011 episode)
 Chaunteé Schuler – Angelique Clark
 Michele Ammon – Jean Anne Whorton
 Kyla Grogan – Andrea Bennett
 Jill Dobson – Madison Daly
 George Riddle – Joad Cressbeckler
 Aaron Lazar – O'Brady Shaw (season 2)
 Michael Torpey – Dan Carlysle, political expert

Oberg was the only actor to appear on two different television shows produced by The Onion. Oberg portrayed Mark Shepard in Onion SportsDome, which aired on Comedy Central until its cancellation in June 2011, and portrayed the "tenth" Tucker Hope on Onion News Network.

Guests
Rachel Maddow and Mike Huckabee appeared as themselves in the fourth episode. Ben Stiller appeared as himself on episode 9, in a fake PSA for "Shaken Man-Child Syndrome". Glenn Beck appeared as himself on the November 1, 2011 episode involving a fictional PBS Frontline documentary about Brooke Alvarez's checkered past which in part may explain her on-air icy demeanor. Beck stated that while auditioning for the part of anchor of FactZone, he implied that Alvarez cut off his brakes and his car ended up in a ditch. Ted Allen appeared on the "Today Now!" special, showing how to cook a dish from his "new book" Pretentious Foodie Bullshit.

Recurring segments
To further invoke the atmosphere of a 24-hour network, The Onion produces the following video series:
 Today Now!: TN is a parody of morning lifestyle and news programs such as NBC's Today and ABC's Good Morning America. Hosted by Jim Haggerty (Brad Holbrook) and Tracy Gill (Tracy Toth), the style is typical of the breezy style often found in morning network television shows, with the presenters either uncritical or completely oblivious to the subject matter presented, regardless of the absurdity of the subject (e.g., Haggerty's earnest question about whether or not an omelet recipe strictly requires a metal shoe-horn to measure the butter into the pan). The series was featured within Porkin Across America.
 War For The White House: ONN's continuing coverage of Presidential and midterm elections, opening with a dramatic video apparently depicting Air Force One and a squadron of fighter planes seemingly attacking the White House. Notable for its consistent use of military terminology (e.g. "Election Analysis Bunker") and deadpan style.
 The Onion Review: Weekly news updates from “America's Finest News Source”
 Onion Special Report: In-depth news coverage accompanied by additional news coverage on theonion.com
 Onion Film Standard: Onion Film Critic Peter K. Rosenthal (Ron Rains) reviews movies both new and old.
 Onion Tips: A self-help style video series that gives suggestions for how people can better themselves and their lives
 OSN: A reference to ESPN, OSN usually features clips from SportsDome, a parody of ESPN's SportsCenter. The clips usually focus on specific parodies of SportsCenter segments such as the Budweiser Hot Seat, which becomes The Steam Room on OSN. Hosts present in the jocular style synonymous with ESPN and sportscasters on sets that are near-identical knockoffs of the SportsCenter studios. On January 11, 2011, cable network Comedy Central launched Onion SportsDome, an offshoot of the OSN feature, marking the first time an ONN feature became a full-fledged television series. It has since been cancelled.
 News Room: A parody of breaking news segments that appear during commercial breaks or replays on 24-hour news networks. News Room is set in the fictional 24-hour cable news television network's news room with TV's and switchboards in the background.
Tech Trends: A newsroom segment about technology.
 Tough Season: A mockumentary-style series examining the world of fantasy football starring real NFL athletes
 StarFix: Parody of Access Hollywood
In The Know: A parody of Sunday morning talk shows like The McLaughlin Group and Meet the Press. The show's full title is In The Know With Clifford Banes, but Banes is never present, with fill-in anchors giving an absurd reason as to why upon introducing themselves. Such as "I'm Julianna McKannis, sitting in for Clifford Banes, who is hunting down the scumbag who killed his father."
Autistic Reporter Michael Falk: A recurring character played by John Cariani

Episodes

Season 1 (2011)

Season 2 (2011)
It was announced on March 22, 2011 that IFC had picked up the show for a second season due to premiere on October 4, 2011.

Critical reception
Onion News Network received generally positive reviews from television critics. Michael Deacon of The Daily Telegraph described it as one "glorious blizzard of absurdity and bathos", while Jack Seale from Radio Times called it a "densely packed, highly intelligent comedy you’ll want to watch for a second or third time". Neil Genzlinger of The New York Times wrote that Onion News Network makes other satirical news programs "sluggish by comparison", before going on to say: "If the longstanding SNL segment is a sort of introductory course in wringing humor from headlines, and Mr. Stewart's Daily Show is the advance-level class, Onion News Network is graduate school, requiring much quicker thinking and a greater tolerance for comfort-zone invasion".

Zoe Williams of The Guardian gave a mixed review of the first episode, stating that, "even by the opening credits I was smiling so much I had a sore face". However, she was critical of the content. "Persistently, where the programme could rip into one thing, it instead chooses something more peripheral, more candyflossy," Williams wrote. Williams criticized a sketch relating to racism in the US judicial system, saying: "This is the kind of thing Jon Stewart could say with one eyebrow or the judicious rolling back of his wheelie presenter's chair. It's true, racism in the American judicial system is certainly worth lambasting, but there just isn't the complexity in the issue to warrant a satirical news story that goes on for four minutes."

International airdates
 : Program premiered The Comedy Channel in October 2011.  It also airs on ABC2.
 : Airs on Super Channel. Confusingly, the front page of the Canadian edition of The Onion carries the same promotional banner as the U.S. editions, incorrectly implying that ONN is carried by IFC Canada.
 : Program premiered on Sky Arts 1 on November 26, 2011

References

External links
 
 The Onion News Network on IFC
 The Onion News Network at Sky Arts

2011 American television series debuts
2011 American television series endings
2010s American satirical television series
2010s American sketch comedy television series
2010s American television news shows
IFC (American TV channel) original programming
The Onion
American news parodies
English-language television shows
Works by Jeff Loveness